Yavapai College is a public community college in Yavapai County, Arizona. The main campus is in Prescott, with locations in Clarkdale, Prescott Valley, Chino Valley and Sedona.

History
Yavapai College was established in 1965 by means of a countywide election. In the four years that followed, a board was appointed, a bond was passed, college personnel were hired, and curricula were established. The first classes were held in fall 1969. In February 1970, the college district dedicated its first buildings in Prescott on a  site that was once part of Fort Whipple, the military base constructed in 1864 to provide security and protection for the territorial capital.

Campus
Yavapai College offers on-campus housing at the Prescott Campus in the two residence halls: Marapai and Kachina. The Rider Diner offers several cafeteria style meals seven days a week. The Common Grounds café located in the Library on the Prescott Campus offers light meals and a wide selection of coffee. Yavapai College operates year-round 24-hour police services.

On October 3, 2012, the Yavapai College District Governing Board approved a motion to support reinvestment in on-campus housing, allotting $5.2 million for the proposed renovation project.

Academics
In 2010-11, the college offered 99 certificate, degree and transfer options to students in 73 different programs of study. In addition to traditional curricula, the college offers many learning options to fit the lifestyles and circumstances of its students. Alternative learning options include credit for prior learning, internships/service learning, non-credit courses, college for children, high school partnerships (dual enrollment), internet courses, open entry/open exit courses, telecourses, senior programs (OLLI, Elderhostel/Edventures) and high school equivalency program (GED testing).

The college offers seven Associate degree programs: Associate of Arts/Associate of Science, Associate of Business Degrees, Associate of Arts in Elementary Education, Associate of Fine Arts Degree, Associate of General Studies Degree Program, Associate Degree in Nursing and Associate of Applied Science Degree

The college is the location of the Yavapai College Gunsmithing School, which for several years was renowned as one of the top three gunsmithing schools in the U.S. with Trinidad State Jr College and Colorado School of Trades.

Student life

Yavapai College currently sponsors four intercollegiate teams - two men (soccer, baseball) and two women (volleyball, softball) - and competes in Division 1 of the National Junior College Athletics Association (NJCAA). The college belongs to the Arizona Community College Athletics Conference (ACCAC), a league of fifteen community colleges in Arizona.

Men's and women's basketball programs were sponsored until 2011, when they were eliminated due to Arizona state budget cuts.

The college athletic teams have distinguished themselves athletically with national championships in soccer (7), baseball (4), softball (2) and cross country (2).

In spring 2014, in joint efforts between students and the athletic department, Yavapai College began streaming and broadcasting sporting events online via its Ustream.tv account.

Notable people

Government
 Ken Bennett, former Arizona Secretary of State

Sports
 Kyle Blanks, professional baseball player
 Kole Calhoun, professional baseball player
Willie Calhoun, professional baseball player
Gabriel Claudio, professional soccer player
 Chad Curtis, professional baseball player
 Roger Espinoza, professional soccer player
 Ken Giles, professional baseball player
 Alan Gordon, professional soccer player
 Billy Hatcher, professional baseball player and coach
 Kelvin Jack, professional soccer player
 Avery John, professional soccer player
 Jesse Maldonado, professional soccer player
 Justin Meram, professional soccer player
 Eric Prindle, mixed martial arts fighter
 Mike Randolph, professional soccer player
 Jennifer Sadler, volleyball player
 John Scearce, professional soccer player
 Curt Schilling, professional baseball player
 Kirby Yates, professional baseball player

Arts
 Brian Stauffer, award-winning illustrator

Science 
 Jani Ingram, chemistry professor

Gallery

References

External links
 Official website

 
Buildings and structures in Yavapai County, Arizona
Community colleges in Arizona
Education in Yavapai County, Arizona
Educational institutions established in 1965
Buildings and structures in Prescott, Arizona
1965 establishments in Arizona